Collings Lakes is an unincorporated community and census-designated place (CDP) located within Buena Vista Township in Atlantic County, New Jersey, United States. As of the 2010 United States Census, the CDP's population was 1,706.

Collings Lakes is not an incorporated municipality, though homes in the neighborhood are subject to certain deed restrictions and to the Collings Lakes Civic Association. Homeowners are not required to become members of the Civic Association, nor are they required to comply with CLCA bylaws. Homeowners are required to pay an annual fee of $48.00 for "maintenance of lakes and beaches". Membership in the CLCA is voluntary per New Jersey Superior Court ruling on September 15, 2006.

Geography
According to the United States Census Bureau, the CDP had a total area of 0.701 square miles (1.816 km2), including 0.639 square miles (1.655 km2) of land and 0.062 square miles (0.161 km2) of water (8.88%).

Demographics

Census 2010

Census 2000
As of the 2000 United States Census there were 1,726 people, 564 households, and 463 families residing in the CDP. The population density was 994.6/km2 (2,574.5/mi2). There were 596 housing units at an average density of 343.5/km2 (889.0/mi2). The racial makeup of the CDP was 88.76% White, 4.11% African American, 0.29% Native American, 0.29% Asian, 4.58% from other races, and 1.97% from two or more races. Hispanic or Latino of any race were 8.52% of the population.

There were 564 households, out of which 39.7% had children under the age of 18 living with them, 61.7% were married couples living together, 13.8% had a female householder with no husband present, and 17.9% were non-families. 13.1% of all households were made up of individuals, and 4.8% had someone living alone who was 65 years of age or older. The average household size was 3.06 and the average family size was 3.29.

In the CDP the population was spread out, with 28.2% under the age of 18, 9.0% from 18 to 24, 31.4% from 25 to 44, 24.5% from 45 to 64, and 6.9% who were 65 years of age or older. The median age was 34 years. For every 100 females, there were 100.2 males. For every 100 females age 18 and over, there were 95.9 males.

The median income for a household in the CDP was $51,042, and the median income for a family was $51,083. Males had a median income of $36,346 versus $25,924 for females. The per capita income for the CDP was $17,903. About 6.3% of families and 8.6% of the population were below the poverty line, including 16.0% of those under age 18 and 8.5% of those age 65 or over.

References

External links
 Official Collings Lakes Website

Buena Vista Township, New Jersey
Census-designated places in Atlantic County, New Jersey